Satyavedu Assembly constituency is constituency of Andhra Pradesh Legislative Assembly, India. It is one among 7 constituencies in the Tirupati district.

Koneti Adimulam of Yuvajana Sramika Rythu Congress Party is currently representing the constituency.

Overview
It is part of the Tirupati Lok Sabha constituency along with other six Vidhan Sabha segments, namely, Sarvepalli, Gudur, Sullurpeta Venkatagiri in Nellore district and Tirupati, Srikalahasti in the Chittoor district.

Mandals

Members of Legislative Assembly

Election results

Assembly Elections 2004

Assembly Elections 2009

Assembly elections 2014

Assembly Elections 2019

See also
 List of constituencies of Andhra Pradesh Vidhan Sabha

References

results.eci.gov.in

Assembly constituencies of Andhra Pradesh